Avshalom Feinberg (23 October 1889 – 20 January 1917) was one of the leaders of Nili, a Jewish spy network in Ottoman Palestine helping the British fight the Ottoman Empire during World War I.

Feinberg was born in Gedera in the Land of Israel, which was then part of the Ottoman Empire. His parents were Israel "Lolik" Feinberg, among the founders of Rishon LeZion, Hadera and Tel Aviv, and Fanny Feinberg (née Belkind). He had two sisters, Tzila and Shoshanna. Among his close relatives were Joseph Feinberg, a paternal uncle who was a founder of Rishon LeZion, and Olga Hankin (née Belkind), a maternal aunt who was a feminist, midwife and redeemer of lands.

Feinberg studied in France. He then returned to work with Aaron Aaronsohn at the agronomy research station in Atlit. Soon after war began, the four Aaronsohn siblings (Sarah Aaronsohn, Rivka, Alex, and Aaron) founded the Nili underground along with Feinberg. They were later joined by Yosef Lishansky and others. In 1915 Feinberg traveled to Egypt and made contact with the British Department of Naval Intelligence. In 1917, he again went to Egypt, on foot. He was apparently killed on his way back by a group of Bedouins near the British front in Sinai, close to Rafah. His fate was unknown until after the 1967 Six-Day War, when his remains were found under a palm tree that had grown from date seeds in his pocket.

In 1979 a new Israeli settlement in the Sinai Peninsula, Avshalom, was named after him. It was abandoned in 1982 after the Camp David Accords, but a new village by the same name was founded in Israel in 1990.

Further reading 
Ot me-Avshalom by Nava Macmel-Atir, 2009 (Hebrew). 
'''Sarah, the Hero of Nili by Dvora Omer, 1967 Hebrew).

References

External links 
 Avshalom Feinberg Zionism-Israel
 Letters written by Avshalom Feinberg at Project Ben-Yehuda 

1889 births
1917 deaths
Burials at Mount Herzl
Civilians killed in World War I
Jews in Ottoman Palestine
People from Gedera
Zionists
Zionist activists
World War I spies for the United Kingdom